Landolt is a Swiss surname. It may refer to:

People
Arlo U. Landolt (1935-2022), American astronomer
Dennis Landolt (born 1986), American footballer
Edmund Landolt (1846–1926), Swiss ophthalmologist who developed "Landolt C"
Elias Landolt (1926–2013), Swiss botanist
Hans Heinrich Landolt (1831–1910), Swiss chemist who discovered iodine clock reaction. also one of the founders of Landolt-Börnstein database
Jaqueline Landolt, Swiss curler, European champion
Kevin Landolt (born 1975), American footballer
Richard B. Landolt, American admiral
Salomon Landolt (1741–1818), Swiss painter

Other
Landolt–Börnstein, systematic data collection in physical sciences and engineering
Landolt C, optotype developed by ophthalmologist Edmund Landolt
Landolt & Cie, Swiss bank
15072 Landolt, asteroid, named after Arlo U. Landolt
Mount Landolt, mountain in Antarctica, named after Arlo U. Landolt